The Common Man is a 1975 French drama film directed by Yves Boisset and produced by Sofracima. It was entered into the 25th Berlin International Film Festival, where it won the Silver Bear - Special Jury Prize.

Cast
 Jean Carmet as Georges Lajoie
 Pierre Tornade as Colin
 Jean Bouise as Detective Boulard
 Michel Peyrelon as Albert Schumacher
 Ginette Garcin as Ginette Lajoie
 Pascale Roberts as Madame Colin
 Jean-Pierre Marielle as Léo Tartaffione
 Robert Castel as Loulou
 Pino Caruso as Vigorelli
 Isabelle Huppert as Brigitte Colin
 Jacques Chailleux as Léon Lajoie
 Henri Garcin as the senior official
 Odile Poisson as Mme Schumacher
 Victor Lanoux as the Strong man
 Mohamed Zinet as Saïd's brother

See also
 Isabelle Huppert on screen and stage

References

External links

1975 films
1975 drama films
Films about racism
Films directed by Yves Boisset
French drama films
1970s French-language films
French vigilante films
Silver Bear Grand Jury Prize winners
1970s French films